Marzabotto is a small town and comune in Italian region Emilia-Romagna, part of the Metropolitan City of Bologna. The area includes the site of an ancient Etruscan city and also the place  of a modern massacre that took place there during World War II.

Etruscan city

In and below the grounds of the Villa Aria, close to the city, are the remains of an Etruscan town of the 5th century BC, Kainua, protected on the west by the mountains, on the south-east by the river, which by a change of course has destroyed about half of it. The acropolis was just below the villa: here remains of temples were found.

The town lay below the modern high-road and was laid out on a rectangular plan divided by main streets into eight quarters, and these in turn into blocks or insulae. Necropoleis were found on the east and north of the site. The place was partially inhabited later by the Gauls, but was not occupied by the Romans.

World War II massacre

On September 29, 1944, during the World War II German occupation of Italy, the town was the site of the worst massacre of civilians committed by the Waffen SS in Italy. In reprisal of the local support given to the partisans and the resistance movement, soldiers of the SS-Panzer-Aufklärungsabteilung 16, killed systematically hundreds of civilians in Marzabotto, and in the adjacent Grizzana Morandi and Monzuno.
The town was awarded the Gold Medal of Military Valour for this episode.
Sculptor Nicola Zamboni created a large monument in the city in 1975 in front of the town hall.

References

External links
 The Two Etruscan Necropolis of Marzabotto and their Sacred Ties with Montovolo by Graziano Baccolini

Cities and towns in Emilia-Romagna
Archaeological sites in Emilia-Romagna
Recipients of the Gold Medal of Military Valor